Whippoorwill is an unincorporated community and census-designated place (CDP) in Osage County, Oklahoma, United States. It was first listed as a CDP prior to the 2020 census.

The CDP is in northeastern Osage County, on a hill overlooking the west end of Hulah Lake, where the Caney River enters it. The Caney is a southeast-flowing tributary of the Verdigris River and part of the Arkansas River watershed.

Demographics

References 

Census-designated places in Osage County, Oklahoma
Census-designated places in Oklahoma